Bluebell Creek is a very minor tributary of the Upper Mississippi River, confined mainly to Millville Township in Clayton County, Iowa, but rising in Liberty Township in Dubuque County. It enters the Mississippi just south of where the Turkey River meets the Big River.

See also
List of rivers of Iowa

References

Tributaries of the Mississippi River
Rivers of Clayton County, Iowa
Rivers of Dubuque County, Iowa
Rivers of Iowa